Before, Now & Then (Indonesian title: Nana) is a 2022 Indonesian period drama film, written and directed by Kamila Andini. It stars Happy Salma as Nana, a woman who is impacted by violent times in rural Indonesia during 1940s to 1960s. The film is adapted from the first chapter of the novel Jais Darga Namaku ( 'My Name Is Jais Darga') by Ahda Imran, telling the true story of Raden Nana Sunani, a woman who lived in the 1960s West Java.

The film had its world premiere at the 72nd Berlin International Film Festival in February 2022. Basuki was awarded Silver Bear for Best Supporting Performance for her performance as Ino.

Premise
Set in West Java, Nana finds refuge in a second marriage after losing her family to war in the 1940s. Then, she befriends her second husband's mistress, Ino, together seeking for the meaning of freedom.

Cast

Production
The principal photography of Before, Now & Then began in March 2021 in Ciwidey, Bandung, West Java.

The film won the CJ ENM Award at the 2021 Asian Project Market Awards during the 26th Busan International Film Festival, winning $10,000 in cash. It also received a post-production grant of $50,000 from Purin Pictures in November 2021.

Release

The film had its world premiere in competition at the 72nd Berlin International Film Festival on 12 February 2022. Prior to, Wild Bunch acquired distribution rights to the film in January 2022.

The film was distributed in Indonesia through streaming service Amazon Prime Video on 1 August 2022.

Reception
Leslie Felperin of The Hollywood Reporter described the film as "an intoxicating, slow-burn melodrama" and praised Batara Goempar's cinematography and Ricky Lionardi's score, calling it "above and beyond". Writing for Variety, Michael Nordine compared the film to the work of Wong Kar-wai and Apichatpong Weerasethakul, stating, "[...] moves with its own dreamy cadence, with narrative developments washing over the film like waves". Wendy Ide of Screen International lauded Salma's performance and described the film as "a handsomely mounted period piece, which acknowledges the strength required by previous generations of Indonesian women to rise above the patriarchal demands of a restrictive society". Rory O'Connor at The Film Stage gave the film a 'B' grade and called it "begins with a ruthless decapitation, it is relentlessly well-mannered: all ointment, no flies".

Accolades

References

External links
 

2022 drama films
2022 films
2020s historical drama films
Films directed by Kamila Andini
Indonesian drama films
Films set in the 1940s
Films set in the 1960s
Films set in Java